Rachid Guerraoui (born January 5, 1967) is a Moroccan-Swiss computer scientist and a professor at the School of Computer and Communication Sciences at École Polytechnique Fédérale de Lausanne (EPFL), known for his contributions in the fields of concurrent and distributed computing. He is an ACM Fellow and the Chair in Informatics and Computational Science for the year 2018–2019 at Collège de France for distributed computing.

Education and career 
Rachid was born on January 5, 1967, in Rabat, Morocco. His father, Mohammed Guerraoui, is a teacher of mathematics and former wali (governor) of Marrakesh. His mother, Fatima Rahmoun-Guerraoui, is a teacher of French. After getting his baccalaureate in 1984, he left Morocco for France.

Guerraoui received his PhD from the University of Orsay (1992) and has been affiliated with Ecole des Mines of Paris, the Commissariat à l'Energie Atomique of Saclay, Hewlett Packard Laboratories and the Massachusetts Institute of Technology. He is an associate (area) editor of the Journal of the ACM and is the co-author of several books, including "Algorithms for Concurrent Systems", "Introduction to Reliable and Secure Distributed Programming" and "Principles of Transactional Memory". He won an ERC Advanced Grant Award (2013) and the Google Focused Award (2014).

With his co-workers, Guerraoui received Best Paper Awards at the following scientific conferences: ACM Middleware (2016, 2014, 2012), ICDCN (2011), Eurosys (2010), DISC (2010) and OPODIS (2006). He also received the 10-Year Best Paper Award at Middleware 2014,

Beyond his scientific and academic work, Guerraoui works on the popularization of computer science. He co-initiated the Wandida teaching project on YouTube, a library of 300++ videos on computer science and mathematics with 2.5 million views and over 25 thousand subscribers, as well as the Zettabytes education project, a library of videos related to introducing major computer science discoveries and open problems to the general public.

Rachid maintains strong ties to Morocco through his participation in the public debate and the Moroccan political life. In December 2019, he was appointed by King Mohammed VI as a member of the Special Committee on Model of Development.

Focal research areas and main publications 
Guerraoui worked on establishing theoretical foundations of Transactional Memory (TM). He co-defined a concept he called opacity, used for establishing correctness of TMs. On the practical side, he co-devised elastic transactions and co-designed SwissTM, a throughput-efficient software transactional memory (STM) as well as a benchmark for TM systems, STMBench7.

Earlier, Guerraoui studied scalable information dissemination methods. His paper on lightweight epidemic broadcast was the first to consider the partial and/or out-of-sync views of different processes in a gossip-based distributed system. This paper, together with Guerraoui's paper on the underlying membership service, gained over 1250 citations combined as of 2018, among which a number of theory papers on the analysis of gossip protocols in realistic settings.

Rachid Guerraoui has a proven record of investigating the foundations of asynchronous distributed computations. For instance, Guerraoui co-established lower bounds for asynchronous gossiping and renaming. He further proved fundamental results on the relationships between classical distributed computing problems, such as atomic commitment and consensus, for which he helped close the then open problem of the weakest failure detector for consensus with any number of faults and co-established a new classification of distributed computing problems. Guerraoui further co-defined a general methodology to build highly concurrent asynchronous data structures and has shown how asynchrony can help build pseudo-random numbers.

Guerraoui invented the mathematical abstraction of indulgence to precisely capture the essence of asynchronous algorithms of which safety does not depend on timing assumptions, such as Lamport's Paxos or Castro-Liskov's PBFT. Guerraoui used that concept to co-define a general framework for secure and reliable distributed protocols.

References 

1967 births
20th-century Moroccan people
21st-century Moroccan people
Moroccan scientists
Living people
Academic journal editors
Academic staff of the Collège de France
Academic staff of the École Polytechnique Fédérale de Lausanne
Fellows of the Association for Computing Machinery
Hewlett-Packard people
Massachusetts Institute of Technology faculty
Moroccan computer scientists
Swiss computer scientists
Swiss expatriates in France
People from Rabat